Aud Haakonsdottir of Lade, also called Öda Haakonsdottir of Lade (10th century), was a legendary Swedish Viking Age queen consort, according to the sagas the last spouse of King Eric the Victorious of Sweden.

Background
Aud was allegedly a daughter of Norwegian Jarl Haakon Sigurdsson of Lade and sister of regent Eiríkr Hákonarson. It is not known exactly if or when she married King Eric, nor when she was born and died, but she is guessed to have married him after his marriage to the famous Sigrid Storråda. The marriage has never been confirmed, and it is also suggested, that if she did exist, she may have been his mistress, or a brief marriage late in his life.

References and literature
Åke Ohlmarks: Alla Sveriges drottningar (All the queens of Sweden) (Swedish)
Lars O. Lagerqvist (1982) (in Swedish). "Sverige och dess regenter under 1.000 år",("Sweden and its rulers during 1000 years").. Albert Bonniers Förlag AB. .

10th-century births
10th-century Norwegian women
10th-century Swedish people
10th-century Swedish women
Aud 0950
People from Trondheim
People whose existence is disputed